Akhtubinsk is a Russian Air Force base located near Akhtubinsk, Astrakhan Oblast, Russia.

The base is home to the 929th State Flight Test Centre named for V. P. Chkalov.

The then-State Red Banner GK Scientific Research Institute VVS was moved to the base from Chkalov in Moscow Oblast in 1960, and the 1st (fighters and fighter-bombers), 2nd (bombers), 5th (radio range), 9th (route measuring complex), and 10th (nuclear test) Scientific-Experimental Departments of the Institute were set up at Akhtubinsk that year.

In 1990 the institute received its current name. 

The aerodrome was in use for testing as early as 1948; in June 1948, V. D. Lutsenko, a test pilot and Hero of the Soviet Union crashed in an aircraft of unknown type. On October 27, 1949, test pilot E.S. Greenfield died in a crash of a La-15 aircraft at Akhtubinsk during the first show of aviation equipment. On April 9, 1963 test pilot V. I. Grotsky died during a test flight of a Sukhoi Su-7B fighter-bomber aircraft near Akhtubinsk airfield.

Aircraft 
5 of the advanced 5th generation Sukhoi Su-57 (ASCC: Falon) supersonic combat jet were spotted on commercial satellite pictures in January 2023.

References

Russian Air Force bases